Irina-Camelia Begu was the defending champion, but decided not to participate this year.

Alexandra Dulgheru won the title, defeating Mandy Minella in the final, 6–3, 1–6, 6–3.

Seeds

Draw

Finals

Top half

Bottom half

References
 Main Draw
 Qualifying Draw

Copa Bionaire - Singles
Copa Bionaire